Ndoye or N'Doye is a Senegalese surname and may refer to:

 Abdoulaye Ndoye (born 1983), Equatoguinean footballer
 Alexandre Ndoye (born 1992), French basketball player
 Birama Ndoye (born 1994), Senegalese footballer
 Cheikh N'Doye (born 1986), Senegalese footballer
 Dame N'Doye (born 1985), Senegalese footballer
 Doudou Ndoye (born 1944), Senegalese lawyer and politician
 Falla N'Doye (born 1960), Senegalese football referee
 Issa Ndoye (born 1985), Senegalese footballer
 Kéné Ndoye (1978-2023), Senegalese female track and field athlete
 Lingeer Ndoye Demba (14th–15th century), Serer princess from the Kingdom of Sine
 Mariama Ndoye (born 1953), Senegalese writer
 Ousmane N'Doye (born 1978), Senegalese footballer

See also
 Ndiaye (disambiguation)
 N'Diaye (disambiguation)
 Njie (disambiguation)

Serer surnames